Kalle Johansson may refer to:

 Kalle Johansson (ice hockey) (born 1993), Swedish ice hockey player
 Kalle Johansson (singer) (born 1997), Swedish singer
 Karl Johansson, Swedish orienteering competitor, also known as Kalle Johansson